Jordanna Phillips (born 19 February 1990) is a Canadian-born Guyanese retired footballer who played as a midfielder. She has been a member of the Guyana women's national team.

Early life
Phillips was raised in Markham, Ontario.

High school and college career
Phillips attended the St. Brother André Catholic High School in her hometown. After graduating there, she joined the Brock University in St. Catharines, Ontario.

International career
In 2009, Phillips participated in a Canadian program identification camp. A year later, she joined the senior Guyana women's national team. She capped for the Lady Jags during the 2010 CONCACAF Women's World Cup Qualifying qualification.

See also
List of Guyana women's international footballers

References

1990 births
Living people
Citizens of Guyana through descent
Guyanese women's footballers
Women's association football midfielders
Guyana women's international footballers
Sportspeople from Markham, Ontario
Soccer people from Ontario
Canadian women's soccer players
Brock University alumni
Canadian sportspeople of Guyanese descent